Fighting Back is a 1982 Australian film about troubled teenagers.

References

External links
Fighting Back at IMDb
Fighting Back at Oz Movies

Australian drama films
1980s English-language films
Films directed by Michael Caulfield
1980s Australian films